The New Zealand Rally Championship (NZRC) is New Zealand's leading off-road motor rally competition. A multi-event national championship has been held each year since 1975. Today the championship is held for a variety of classes based on engine capacity and further split by four or two wheel drive. The top class for a number of years has been the CAT1 class, featuring R5, NR4, and AP4 cars.

The New Zealand Rally Championship has been a launching pad for the career of many New Zealand drivers. Rod Millen and Possum Bourne being the most notable. Recently Hayden Paddon has used the series as a springboard to international competition, competing in the Asia-Pacific Rally Championship before moving on to the Production, Super 2000 World Rally Championship, and World Rally Championships.

The championship was formed around the then newly created Rally New Zealand when it joined the World Rally Championship in 1973. Since then Rally New Zealand has frequently been the starring event of the NZRC and the event is current based in Auckland. The International Rally of Whangarei and International Rally of Otago are also rounds of the NZRC as well as being rounds of the Asia-Pacific Rally Championship. The current 2022 championship also takes in events based in Canterbury.

Champions

Drivers
Sourced from:

Co-Drivers
Sourced from:

2WD

Drivers

Co-drivers

NZ Rally Challenge Series (4WD)

Drivers

Co-Drivers

Junior

Drivers

Co-Drivers

Manufacturers

Rookie

Drivers

Co-Drivers

Teams Cup

Multiple Winners

Drivers

Co-Drivers

References

External links
Series Official Web Site

Rally racing series
Motorsport competitions in New Zealand